is a Japanese seinen manga magazine published by Enterbrain on a monthly basis since November 1995. In 2006, it had a circulation of 25,000. Popular manga serialized in Comic Beam include Kaoru Mori's Emma about the love story between a maid and an aristocratic man in Victorian England. Emma was adapted into an anime series and translated into many languages. Koi no Mon (Otakus in Love) revolves around a group of otaku, their lives and romantic relationships. The comedy by Hanyu-new was made into a film in 2004. Comic Beam is considered an "alternative" manga magazine in the Japanese publishing industry, where its 25,000 circulation is less than 1% of other more popular manga magazines like Weekly Shōnen Jump. Its small but loyal readership is regarded as consisting largely of hardcore comic enthusiast and art students.

Serialized titles

 Areyo Hoshikuzu by Sansuke Yamada
  by Marginal and Syuji Takeya
 Bambi and Her Pink Gun by Atsushi Kaneko
 Desert Punk by Usune Masatoshi
 Emma by Kaoru Mori
 Emma Bangaihen by Kaoru Mori
 EVOL by Atsushi Kaneko (ongoing)
  by Junko Mizuno
 King of Thorn by Yuji Iwahara
 Little Miss P by Ken Koyama (ongoing)
 Lost Lad London by Shinya Shima
 Otakus in Love by Jun Hanyunyū
  by Satoshi Fukushima
  by Atsushi Kaneko
 The Strange Tale of Panorama Island by Suehiro Maruo
 Ultra Heaven by Keiichi Koike (on hiatus)
 Wandering Son by Takako Shimura
  by Kotobuki Shiriagari
 Thermae Romae by Mari Yamazaki
 Zombie Hunter by Kazumasa Hirai (author) and Yang Kyung-il

References

External links
Official website 

1995 establishments in Japan
Magazines established in 1995
Magazines published in Tokyo
Monthly manga magazines published in Japan
Seinen manga magazines
Enterbrain manga